The Ohio Department of Commerce is the administrative department of the Ohio state government responsible for regulating banks and savings institutions, credit unions, mortgage lenders and consumer finance businesses; securities professionals and products; real estate professionals and cable television; and the building industry; and also collects and holds unclaimed funds. The Division of Liquor Control and Division of the State Fire Marshal are also part of the department.

References

External links
Official website

Commerce
Bank regulation in the United States by state